is a private university in Ichikawa, Chiba, Japan, established in 1950. The predecessor of the school was founded in 1928.

External links

 

Educational institutions established in 1928
Private universities and colleges in Japan
Ichikawa, Chiba
Universities and colleges in Chiba Prefecture
1928 establishments in Japan